Estadio Antonio Toledo Valle is a multi-use stadium in Zacatecoluca, El Salvador. It is currently used mostly for football matches and is the home stadium of C.D. Platense Municipal Zacatecoluca. The stadium currently has a capacity of 10,000 people.
It was built in 1974, on orders of then president of El Salvador Arturo Armando Molina.
The stadium is named after Antonio Toledo Valle, a native footballer from the region who went on to play for C.D. Platense Municipal Zacatecoluca and several clubs in El Salvador and Mexico.

External links
https://web.archive.org/web/20120225213936/http://www.laprensagrafica.com/el-salvador/departamentos/24376-remodelacion-del-estadio-prevista-para-mayo.html (Renovations)
http://www.fisdl.gob.sv/novedades/noticias/1913.html

1974 establishments in El Salvador
Football venues in El Salvador
Multi-purpose stadiums in El Salvador
Sports venues completed in 1974